Pristavica pri Velikem Gabru is a small settlement west of Bič in the Municipality of Trebnje in eastern Slovenia. The A2 Slovenian motorway runs along the southern edge of the settlement. The area is part of the historical region of Lower Carniola. The municipality is now included in the Southeast Slovenia Statistical Region.

Name
The name of the settlement was changed from Pristavica to Pristavica pri Velikem Gabru in 1953.

References

External links

Pristavica pri Velikem Gabru at Geopedia

Populated places in the Municipality of Trebnje